Agricultural University College EIIN-111913 (Bengali: কৃষি বিশ্ববিদ্যালয় কলেজ) is a higher secondary college located at Mymensingh District, Bangladesh. Its former name was K.B Intermediate College.it has Day shift, version Bangla. It was established in 1985.

History of  Institute 
The college was established on 23 September 1985 under the patronage of Bangladesh Agricultural University. Located in a beautiful and beautiful environment in the residential area adjacent to Gate No. 1 of Bangladesh Agricultural University, the college was able to gain a good reputation in a short period of time due to its uniqueness and creativity. The college has been ranked in the top ten in the Dhaka Board of Education as the only college in the greater Mymensingh region in a short span of time. The contribution of this college in fulfilling the evolving social needs, responsibility, transparency, creation of skilled, qualified and creative human resources as the future good citizens in the spirit of liberation war is undeniable. And all the activities to build it as a school of quality advanced education have been completed. 

The college has developed into a field for the development of free thinking and the spread of modern epistemology. The college has ensured a sophisticated university learning environment.

Admission
Every year Agricultural University College takes around 720 students in the science section and 300 students in business study section. Previously, there was an admission test, but now an interview is required.

Education

The college follows the national curriculum. The college operates by the governing body of the college. The college has a library with 15,000 volumes, and physics, chemistry, computer, biology, and mathematics labs. Bright students are sent to participate in mathematics, physics, and astronomy Olympiads.

College uniform

For boys
Terracotta pants
White shirts

For girls 
 White salwar and pajama
 Terracotta orna

Academic performance
In 2007 the college gained 10th place in Dhaka division in accordance with total GPA.

References

1-https://www.aucm.edu.bd/  Agricultural University College. Retrieved 2022-04-10.

2-https://www.bau.edu.bd/ "Bangladesh Agricultural University. Retrieved 2022-04-10.

Colleges in Mymensingh District
Agricultural universities and colleges in Bangladesh